Wayne Martin is the name of:

 Wayne Martin (American football) (born 1965), American football defensive lineman 
 Wayne Martin (Branch Davidian) (born 1951), lawyer and Branch Davidian 
 Wayne Martin (cricketer) (born 1955), New Zealand cricketer
 Wayne Martin (footballer) (born 1965), English footballer
 Wayne Martin (judge) (born 1952), Chief Justice of Western Australia